Sarcocapnos (Greek sárx "flesh", kapnós "smoke") is a genus of at least 6 species of somewhat fleshy, cushion-forming annual to perennial plants, native to cliffs in the French Pyrenees, Spain, and north Africa.

Description
As in the genus Corydalis (but unlike Dicentra), the flowers are zygomorphic, that is, they have bilateral symmetry.

Species
There are at least 6 species:
 Sarcocapnos baetica (Boiss. & Reut.) Nyman
 Sarcocapnos crassifolia (Desf.) DC.
 Sarcocapnos enneaphylla (L.) DC.
 Sarcocapnos integrifolia (Boiss.) Cuatrec.
 Sarcocapnos pulcherrima C. Morales & Romero García
 Sarcocapnos saetabensis Mateo & Figuerola

References

Bleeding Hearts, Corydalis, and Their Relatives. Mark C. Tebbitt, Magnus Lidén, Henrik Zetterlund. 2008. — Google Books

External links

Botany Photo of the Day — University of British Columbia Botanical Garden

Fumarioideae
Papaveraceae genera